Ruth Fisher may refer to:
 Ruth Fisher (Six Feet Under), a character from the American TV series Six Feet Under
 Ruth Alice Fisher, British missionary to Uganda
 Ruth Anna Fisher, American historian, archivist, and teacher

See also
 Ruth Fischer, Austrian and German communist